Conetoe is a town in Edgecombe County, North Carolina, United States. It is part of the Rocky Mount, North Carolina Metropolitan Statistical Area. The population was 294 at the 2010 census.

History
The Wilkinson-Dozier House and Worsley-Burnette House are listed on the National Register of Historic Places.

Geography
Conetoe is located at  (35.817265, -77.458033).

Demographics

As of the census of 2000, there were 365 people, 125 households, and 90 families residing in the town. The population density was 996.4 people per square mile (380.9/km2). There were 139 housing units at an average density of 379.5 per square mile (145.0/km2). The racial makeup of the town was 35.07% White, 63.56% African American and 1.37% Native American. Hispanic or Latino of any race were 5.48% of the population.

There were 125 households, out of which 30.4% had children under the age of 18 living with them, 48.0% were married couples living together, 18.4% had a female householder with no husband present, and 28.0% were non-families. 24.0% of all households were made up of individuals, and 13.6% had someone living alone who was 65 years of age or older. The average household size was 2.92 and the average family size was 3.47.

In the town, the population was spread out, with 28.8% under the age of 18, 7.9% from 18 to 24, 25.8% from 25 to 44, 23.6% from 45 to 64, and 14.0% who were 65 years of age or older. The median age was 38 years. For every 100 females, there were 85.3 males. For every 100 females age 18 and over, there were 89.8 males.

The median income for a household in the town was $35,227, and the median income for a family was $36,932. Males had a median income of $28,125 versus $24,688 for females. The per capita income for the town was $14,774. About 11.7% of families and 11.8% of the population were below the poverty line, including 12.8% of those under age 18 and 23.3% of those age 65 or over.

References

Towns in Edgecombe County, North Carolina
Towns in North Carolina
Rocky Mount metropolitan area